Bethel is an unincorporated community in Haywood County, North Carolina, United States.

History
Prior to European colonization, the area that is now Bethel was inhabited by the Cherokee people and other Indigenous peoples for thousands of years. The Cherokee in Western North Carolina are known as the Eastern Band of Cherokee Indians, a federally recognized tribe.

Notable person

Max Thompson (1922–1996), Medal of Honor recipient, was born in Bethel.

Notes

Unincorporated communities in Haywood County, North Carolina
Unincorporated communities in North Carolina